Newport Stone Arch Bridge is a historic stone arch bridge located at Newport in Herkimer County, New York. It was constructed in 1853 and spans West Canada Creek.  It is 238 feet long and has four arch spans with rises of 16 to 22 feet.

It was listed on the National Register of Historic Places in 1992.

References

Road bridges on the National Register of Historic Places in New York (state)
Bridges completed in 1853
Bridges in Herkimer County, New York
National Register of Historic Places in Herkimer County, New York
Stone arch bridges in the United States